The 1985–86 season was the 106th season of competitive football by Rangers.

Overview
Rangers played a total of 44 competitive matches during the 1985–86 season. The team finished a disappointing 5th in the Scottish Premier Division. A total of 35 points were gained from 36 games with only 13 wins and 14 defeats. This resulted in the departure of Jock Wallace as manager in April with the club announcing that Scotland captain Graeme Souness would take over as player-manager after the World Cup Finals in Mexico.

In the cup competitions, they were knocked out of the Scottish Cup in the third round, losing 3–2 at Tynecastle to Hearts. They were knocked out of the League Cup by Edinburgh's other team Hibernian 2–1 on aggregate in the two legged semi final.

The European campaign lasted two matches. The club went out in the first round of the UEFA Cup after losing to Spanish side CA Osasuna. The first leg at Ibrox was won 1–0 thanks to a Craig Paterson goal but the team went down 2–0 in the second leg.

Rangers qualified for Europe on the last day of the season, beating Motherwell 2–0 at Ibrox.

The Glasgow Cup was won with a 3–2 victory over Celtic at Ibrox in May. This match presented an early opportunity for the players to impress their new boss.

Results
All results are written with Rangers' score first.

Scottish Premier Division

UEFA Cup

Scottish Cup

League Cup

*Rangers won 6–5 on penalties

Glasgow Cup

Appearances

League table

See also
 1985–86 in Scottish football
 1985–86 Scottish Cup
 1985–86 Scottish League Cup
 1985–86 UEFA Cup

References 

Rangers F.C. seasons
Rangers